Biocon Limited is an Indian biopharmaceutical company based in Bangalore. It was founded by Kiran Mazumdar-Shaw in 1978. The company manufactures generic active pharmaceutical ingredients (APIs) that are sold in approximately 120 countries, including the United States and Europe. It also manufactures novel biologics as well as biosimilar insulins and antibodies, which are sold in India as branded formulations. Biocon's biosimilar products are also sold in both bulk and formulation forms in several emerging markets.

Biocon's formulations for the Indian market include metabolics, oncology, immunotherapy and nephrology products. Some of Biocon's key brands in India include INSUGEN (rh-insulin), BASALOG (Glargine), BIOMAb EGFR (Nimotuzumab), BLISTO (Glimepiride + Metformin), CANMAb (Trastuzumab), Evertor (Everolimus), TACROGRAF (Tacrolimus), ALZUMAb(Itolizumab) and KRABEVA (Bevacizumab).

Syngene International Limited (Syngene) is a publicly listed subsidiary of Biocon, operating in the contract research services space. Biocon and Syngene together employ about 9,200 personnel.

History
Biocon was founded in 1978 with Rs.10,000 as the initial capital.
 1979 - Becomes the first Indian company to manufacture and export enzymes to the US and Europe.
 1989 - Unilever acquires Biocon Biochemicals Ltd. in Ireland and merges it with its subsidiary, Quest International; Biocon receives US funding for proprietary technologies.
 1994 - Establishes Syngene International Pvt. Ltd. as a Custom Research Company (CRC).
 1998 - Unilever agrees to sell its shareholding in Biocon to the Indian promoters. Biocon becomes an independent entity.
 2001 - Becomes the first Indian company to be approved by USFDA for the manufacture of lovastatin; PlaFractor is granted a US 2001 and worldwide patent.
 2003 - Biocon becomes the first company worldwide to develop human insulin on a Pichia expression system.
 2006 - BIOMAb EGFR, first indigenously developed humanised monoclonal antibody for head-and-neck cancer is launched and Dr. APJ Abdul Kalam inaugurates India's Largest Biotech-Hub "Biocon Park".
 * 2008 - Biocon acquires a 70% stake in German pharmaceutical company, AxiCorp GmbH.
 2009 - Syngene-Bristol Myers Squibb research facility is established in Bengaluru.
 2009 - Mylan announces strategic collaboration with Biocon to Enter the Global Generic Biologics Market.
 2010 - Biocon expands to Malaysia, biopharmaceutical manufacturing and R&D facility established in Iskandar Malaysia, Johor.
 2011 - Biocon launches INSUPen®, a convenient and affordable reusable insulin delivery device.
 2012 - Abbott announces collaboration with Syngene to Open First Nutrition R&D Center in India.
 2013 - Biocon launches biologic drug ALZUMAb to treat psoriasis.
 2014 - Biocon launches world's first biosimilar drug CANMAb to treat breast cancer.
 2015 - Biocon launches hepatitis-C drug in India under brand name CIMIVIR-L.
 2016 - Becomes the first Indian company to launch a biosimilar Insulin Glargine pen in Japan.
 2016 - Syngene sets up Amgen R&D center in Bangalore.
 2017 - Biocon's Insugen is the first locally manufactured biosimilar product to be approved for sale by the Malaysian drug regulator.
 2017 - USFDA approves Mylan-Biocon's biosimilar for cancer drug Herceptin.
 2018 - Biocon, Mylan get European Commission approval to market biosimilar insulin glargine.
 2021 - Biocon Biologics and Serum Institute of India formed a joint agreement to commercialise vaccines, biological drugs, and antibody therapies together. Another aspect of the deal involves Bicocon selling 15% of its biologics subsidiary to Serum Institute of India, in return for Biocon gaining access to 100 million annual doses of vaccines for a 15-year period.
 2022 - Biocon Biologics buys the biosimilar assets of Viatris, for $3.34 billion.

Corporate governance

Biocon's CMD Kiran Mazumdar–Shaw joined Biocon in 1978.

Her efforts in biotechnology have drawn global recognition both for the industry in India and for Biocon and was called India's "biotech queen" by The Economist and India's "mother of invention" by The New York Times. She was named among Time magazine's 2010 100 most influential people in the world based not only on her contribution to the biotech industry but also because she gives back to the community. Shaw features on the Forbes list of "The World's 100 Most Powerful Women" and in the Financial Times "Top 50 Women in Business" list.

Shaw is the recipient of several awards including the Nikkei Asia Prize, 2009 for Regional Growth, Express Pharmaceutical Leadership Summit Award 2009 for Dynamic Entrepreneur, The Economic Times 'Businesswoman of the Year', the 'Veuve Clicquot Initiative For Economic Development For Asia, Ernst & Young's Entrepreneur of the Year Award for Life Sciences & Healthcare, 'Technology Pioneer' recognition by World Economic Forum and the Indian Chamber of Commerce Lifetime Achievement Award. She has received two Indian national awards—Padma Shri (1989) and Padma Bhushan (2005) for her pioneering efforts in Industrial Biotechnology.

Biocon announced that Dr. Christiane Hamacher has been appointed as the CEO of Biocon Biologic India Limited, with her term having started in March 2019.

On 3 December 2019, Siddharth Mittal took over from Dr. Arun Chandavarkar who retired as CEO & Joint Managing Director of Biocon.

Subsidiaries

Biocon Biologics 
Biocon Biologics is Biocon's biosimilar subsidiary. In 2021 Biocon and Viatris received approval to launch Semglee, an insulin glargine-yfgn injection, which is the first interchangble biosimilar for diabetes in the United States. In 2021, Biocon Biologics sold 15% of the subsidiary to Serum Institute of India for a valuation of $4.9 billion, for which Biocon will receive access to 100 million doses of vaccines per annum for 15 years. These vaccines will mainly be supplied from Serum Institute's upcoming vaccine facility in Pune, and Biocon will also have the commercialization rights of Serum Institute's vaccine portfolio, which includes the COVID-19 vaccine, for the international markets. In May 2022, Viatris sold its biosimilars division to Biocon Biologies for a price of US$3.335 billion.

Syngene International Ltd
Established in 1993, Syngene International Limited is a contract research and development organization (CDMO). In the CDMO space, Syngene primarily focuses on research innovation and manufacturing services for their clients. The company has four divisions: drug discovery services, dedicated research centres, development devices and manufacturing. Syngene works with eight of the top 10 global pharma firms and, the company's clients include Amgen, Zoetis, GlaxoSmithKline and Bristol Myers Squibb. Syngene has been expanding its operations. Since 2020, he company has opened an R&D centre in Hyderabad, is building an API manufacturing facility in Mangalore, which is scheduled to be commissioned in 2022, and has expanded their R&D facility in Bangalore. Syngene also provides biologics CDMO services. In July 2022, Syngene signed a 10-year agreement with Zoetis to manufacture the drug substance for Librela (bedinvetmab), a first-in-class monoclonal antibody used for treating osteoarthritis in dogs. SynVent is Syngene's drug discovery and development platform for both small and large molecules. In September 2022, Biocon divested 5.4% of its shares in Syngene International.

Clinigene 
Clinigene International Limited is a subsidiary on Syngene offering international pharmaceutical majors Phase I-IV clinical trials and studies for novel/generic molecules.

BBPL
Biocon established Biocon Biopharmaceuticals Pvt. Ltd. (BBPL) in 2003 as a joint venture with the Cuban institute CIMAB to develop and market a range of MAbs and cancer vaccines.

Biocon-AxiCorp
In 2008, Biocon acquired a majority stake of 70% in AxiCorp GmbH, a German pharmaceutical marketing company.

NeoBiocon
Incorporated in January 2008, NeoBiocon FZ LLC is a research and marketing pharmaceutical company based in Abu Dhabi.

Biofusion Therapeutics Limited
Incorporated in March 2021, 100% owned by Biocon.

Strategic partnerships

Biocon and Amylin
In 2009, Biocon and Amylin Pharmaceuticals of the United States entered into an agreement to develop, commercialise and manufacture a novel peptide therapeutic for the potential treatment of diabetes. Amylin provides expertise in peptide hormone development, particularly in the area of phybrid technology and metabolic disease therapeutics. Biocon will utilise its expertise in recombinant microbial expression and experience in preclinical and clinical development of diabetes products to manufacture the compound.

Biocon and IATRICa
In 2008, Biocon and IATRICa of the United States announced a strategic partnership to co-develop immunoconjugates for targeted immunotherapy of cancers and infectious diseases. The companies are co-developing candidate products based upon IATRICa's technology platform and Biocon's expertise in drug development, biologics manufacturing, and clinical research. The goal of this collaboration is to develop a therapeutic vaccine where the T cell mediated immunity is enhanced and maintained against a tumor which otherwise evades immune responses. Methods of developing, characterising and scaling up of conjugated monoclonal antibody production are being currently studied.

Biocon and Viatris
In 2009, Biocon signed a collaboration agreement with Viatris to develop and commercialize generic biologics. Viatris and Biocon will share development, capital and other costs to bring products to market. Viatris will have exclusive commercialisation rights in USA, Canada, Japan, Australia, New Zealand, EU and European Free Trade Association countries through a profit sharing arrangement with Biocon.

Biocon and Optimer
Biocon and Optimer Pharmaceuticals, a biopharmaceutical company focused on the treatment of serious infections such as Clostridium Difficile Infection (CDI), have entered into a long-term supply agreement for the commercial manufacturing of the active pharmaceutical ingredient, fidaxomicin.,

Biocon and Vaccinex
Biocon is also developing fully human antibodies BVX 10 and BVX-20 with a US antibody technology partner, Vaccinex. The partnership was initiated in 2004. BVX 10 targets TNF (Tumor Necrosis Factor) which is expressed at high levels in patients with rheumatoid arthritis. Biocon's strategic partnership with Vaccinex allows access to their proprietary human antibody platform technology, thereby providing a strong IP protection to Biocon's antibody pipeline.,

Biocon and Abraxis
In 2007, Biocon and Abraxis BioScience, Inc. entered into an agreement which helped Biocon out-license the rights to develop and market a biosimilar version of GCSF (Granulocyte Colony-Stimulating Factor) to North American and European markets.

Biocon and Sandoz 
In January 2018, Sandoz (a Novartis division) announced a global partnership with Biocon to develop, manufacture and commercialize multiple biosimilars in immunology and oncology for patients worldwide. .

Biocon technology
Biocon's manufacturing facilities are located at two sites in Bangalore.

Research & development capabilities 
Biocon's R&D focuses on the entire drug development pathway – from process development to non-clinical and clinical research.

Products
Biocon offers 36 brands of products across the four therapeutic divisions of diabetology, nephrology, oncology, and cardiology.

References

Biotechnology companies of India
Pharmaceutical companies established in 1978
Pharmaceutical companies of India
Manufacturing companies based in Bangalore
Biotechnology companies established in 1978
Indian companies established in 1978
Indian brands
1978 establishments in Karnataka
Companies listed on the National Stock Exchange of India
Companies listed on the Bombay Stock Exchange